Yulian is a given name. Notable people with the name include:

Erry Yulian Triblas Adesta (born 1962), Indonesian academic and Professor
Yulián Anchico (born 1984), Colombian professional footballer
Yulian Bachynsky (1870–1940), Ukrainian diplomat
Yulian Bromley (1921–1990), Soviet Russian anthropologist who gained an international recognition
Yulian Kurtelov (born 1988), prolific goalscorer Bulgarian football player
Yulian Levashki (born 1981), Bulgarian footballer
Yulian Manev (born 1966), Bulgarian former footballer
Yulian Panich (born 1931), Soviet / Russian actor, director, and journalist
Yulian Pelesh (1843–1896), Ukrainian Greek Catholic hierarch in present-day Ukraine and Poland
Yulian Petkov (born 1979), retired Bulgarian footballer who last played for Lokomotiv 1929 Sofia
Yulian Popev (born 1986), Bulgarian footballer
Yulian Popovich (born 1990), Kazakhstani professional ice hockey forward
Yulian Radionov (born 1979), retired Bulgarian professional basketball player and coach
Yulian Radulski (1972–2013), Bulgarian chess Grandmaster
Yulian Semyonov (1931–1993), Soviet and Russian writer of spy fiction and detective fiction
Yulian Shpol (1895–1937), Ukrainian communist poet-futurist, prose writer, playwright
Yulian Vasilev (born 1961), Bulgarian swimmer
Yulian Vergov (born 1970), Bulgarian actor
Yulian Voronovskyi (1936–2013), Eparchial bishop of Ukrainian Catholic Eparchy of Sambir-Drohobych
Anggo Yulian (born 1987), Indonesian footballer
Chen Yulian (born 1960), popular Hong Kong TV actress, especially during the 1980s

See also
Hayuliang
Julian (disambiguation)
Yu Liang
Yulan (disambiguation)
Yuli (disambiguation)
Yulia
Yuliana
Yulianna